Not Guilty (French: Non coupable) is a 1947 French crime drama film directed by Henri Decoin and starring Michel Simon, Jean Debucourt and Jany Holt. It was shot at the Billancourt Studios in Paris. The film's sets were designed by the art director Emile Alex.

Synopsis
An alcoholic doctor, portrayed by Ancelin, accidentally kills someone when driving home intoxicated. Likely due to his knowledge of medicine, he manages to conceal the death as an accident. The situation unlocks a newfound self-confidence in the doctor which he then applies to other aspects of his life requiring repair.

Cast
 Michel Simon as Le docteur Michel Ancelin  
 Jean Debucourt as L'inspecteur Chambon  
 Jany Holt as Madeleine Bodin 
 Georges Bréhat as Aubignac  
 François Joux as Le lieutenant Louvet  
 Charles Vissières as L'antiquaire  
 Pierre Juvenet as Gillois, le notaire  
 Robert Dalban as Gustave, le patron du café  
 Henri Charrett as L'inspecteur Noël  
 Ariane Murator as Madame Bastard, la mère de la petite malade  
 Christiane Delacroix as la femme de Gustave  
 Emile Chopitel as Tournier  
 Max Tréjean 
 Jean Wall as Le docteur Dumont  
 Jean Brunel as Refardont  
 André Darnay as Maître Corneau  
 Jean Sylvère as Un ami du Docteur Ancelin

References

Bibliography 
 Dayna Oscherwitz & MaryEllen Higgins. The A to Z of French Cinema. Scarecrow Press, 2009.

External links 
 

1947 films
French crime drama films
1947 crime drama films
1940s French-language films
Films directed by Henri Decoin
Films shot at Billancourt Studios
French black-and-white films
1940s French films